Echem is a municipality in the district of Lüneburg, in Lower Saxony, Germany. Echem has an area of 10.72 km² and a population of 1,021 (as of December 31, 2007).

References